Lebanon returned to the 2002 Winter Olympics in Salt Lake City, United States after missing both the 1994 and 1998 editions.

Alpine skiing

Men

Women

References
Official Olympic Reports
 Olympic Winter Games 2002, full results by sports-reference.com

Nations at the 2002 Winter Olympics
2002 Winter Olympics
Winter Olympics